Jack Seale Heidemann (born July 11, 1949 in Brenham, Texas) is an American former professional baseball player. Heidemann was the 1st round draft choice by the Cleveland Indians in the 1967 Major League Baseball Draft.

Baseball career
Heidemann attended Brenham High School. Originally drafted 11th overall by the Indians in 1967, he made his debut on May 2,  at the age of 19. The sixth youngest player that year in the Majors, he appeared in three games, collected three at-bats and hit .000 in that time.

As the team's starter, he hit only .211 with six home runs, although he did collect a hit in his first at-bat of the season. He was the only starting player not to hit 10 home runs for the 1970 Indians. He kept his job through the  season, for the most part. In 81 games that year, he hit only .208 with no home runs and nine RBI. The former first round draft pick obviously wasn't living up to what was expected of him. He was injured for some time during the 1971 season, suffering from a concussion and knee injury. He suffered the concussion on May 17, when Tommy McCraw hit a 140 (one source says 250) foot pop fly that should have been an out. Instead, Heidemann, Vada Pinson and John Lowenstein collided in the outfield, and McCraw actually got an inside-the-park home run.

In those 10 games, he came to bat 20 times and hit only .150. He was traded along with Ray Fosse from the Indians to the Oakland Athletics for Dave Duncan and George Hendrick on March 24, 1973.

 was Heidemann's best season, even though he hit only .247. He started the season out with the Indians, but after collecting only one hit in his first 11 at-bats, he was traded to the Cardinals for Luis Alvarado and Ed Crosby on June 1. His average skyrocketed while with the Cardinals-he hit .271 with them in 47 games.

He was traded to the Mets with Mike Vail for Ted Martínez during the 1974/1975 offseason.

He hit .214 with one home run-his first since 1970-and 16 RBI. He started the  season with the Mets, but hit only .083 in his first 12 at-bats, so he was traded to the Brewers for minor leaguer Tom Deidel. With the Brewers that year, he hit .219 with two home runs. Overall, he hit .209 that year, collecting 10 RBI.

Used almost entirely as a defensive replacement/pinch runner in the five games he played that year, he collected no hits in one at-bat, although he did score a run.

Overall, he hit .211 in his career with 9 home runs and 75 RBI. He was a .966 career fielder. He compares most statistically to Alvarado, and he spent 5 seasons with Dick Tidrow, John Lowenstein and Phil Hennigan-longer than any other teammates. He collected his final hit off Dave Roberts and his final home run off Bill Lee.

Heidemann is the uncle of Brett Bordes, a former minor league pitcher in the Baltimore Orioles organization. He is also related to Bordes' father, Charles Bordes – who played minor league baseball – and grandfather, Bill Cutler, who is the former president of the Pacific Coast League.

References

External links

Baseball Reference (Minors)
Baseball Gauge
Pura Pelota : VPBL batting statistics
Retrosheet

1949 births
Baseball players from Texas
Cleveland Indians players
Florida Instructional League Indians players
Leones del Caracas players
American expatriate baseball players in Venezuela
Living people
Major League Baseball shortstops
Milwaukee Brewers players
New York Mets players
People from Brenham, Texas
Portland Beavers players
Reno Silver Sox players
Rock Hill Indians players
St. Louis Cardinals players
Spokane Indians players
Tidewater Tides players
Tucson Toros players
Tulsa Oilers (baseball) players
Wichita Aeros players